Marie Nathusius, née Scheele (March 10, 1817 in Magdeburg – December 22, 1857 in Neinstedt) was a German novelist and composer.

Life 
Her father was the Calvinist parson Friedrich August Scheele. Marie Nathusius grew up in Calbe (Saale). 1841 she married the publisher Philipp von Nathusius (1815–1872). The couple lived in Althaldensleben and later founded in Neinstedt a charitable organization for the disabled (Neinstedter Anstalten). Nathusius had seven children, including the politician Philipp von Nathusius-Ludom (1842–1900) and the theologian Martin von Nathusius (1843-1906). A granddaughter was the novelist Annemarie von Nathusius (1874–1926).

Nathusius was one of the most-read novelists in the second half of the 19th century in Germany. Her bestsellers Tagebuch eines armen Fräuleins, Langenstein und Boblingen and Elisabeth. Eine Geschichte, die nicht mit der Heirat schließt have been translated and published in several countries.

Major works 
 Tagebuch eines armen Fräuleins. Abgedruckt zur Unterhaltung und Belehrung junger Mädchen; 1854
 Joachim von Kamern. Ein Lebenslauf; 1854
 Langenstein und Boblingen; 1855 
 Rückerinnerungen aus einem Mädchenleben; 1855
 Die alte Jungfer; 1857
 Elisabeth. Eine Geschichte, die nicht mit der Heirat schließt; 1858
 Die Geschichten von Christfried und Julchen; 1858
 Hundert Lieder, geistlich und weltlich, ernsthaft und fröhlich ...; 1865

Translations 
Luisa von Plettenhaus. The journal of a poor young lady („Tagebuch eines armen Fräuleins“); T. Constable & Co. (Edinburgh), 1854; C.S. Francis & Co. (New York, Boston), 1857
Elizabeth. A story which does not end in marriage („Elisabeth“); Simpkin, Marshall & Co. (London); Grant & Son (Edinburgh), 1860
Step by step. The good first; R. Bentley, London, 1860
Above her station. A story of a young woman's life, übersetzt von Mrs Herman Philip; Alexander Strahan & Co. (Edinburgh), 1859; Hamilton, Adams & Co. (London), 1859; Follett, Foster & Company (New York), 1863
Joachim von Kamern/Diary of a poor young lady („Joachim von Kamern“), übersetzt von Miss Thompson; B. Tauchnitz (Leipzig), 1869; Sampson Low, Son & Marston (London), 1869; C. Reinwald (Paris), 1869
Christfrieds first morning („Christfried“-Serie), aus der Reihe: Little tales for little people, Johnstone, Hunter, Edinburgh, 1870
Katie von Walden. Langenstein and Boblingen („Langenstein und Boblingen“), übersetzt von Mary A. Robinson; American Sunday School Union, 8 & 10 Bills House, New York, 1892

External links 

Biography (in German)
, Exhibition at the Historic Museum Magdeburg
 

1817 births
1857 deaths
German women novelists
19th-century German composers
19th-century German novelists
19th-century German women writers